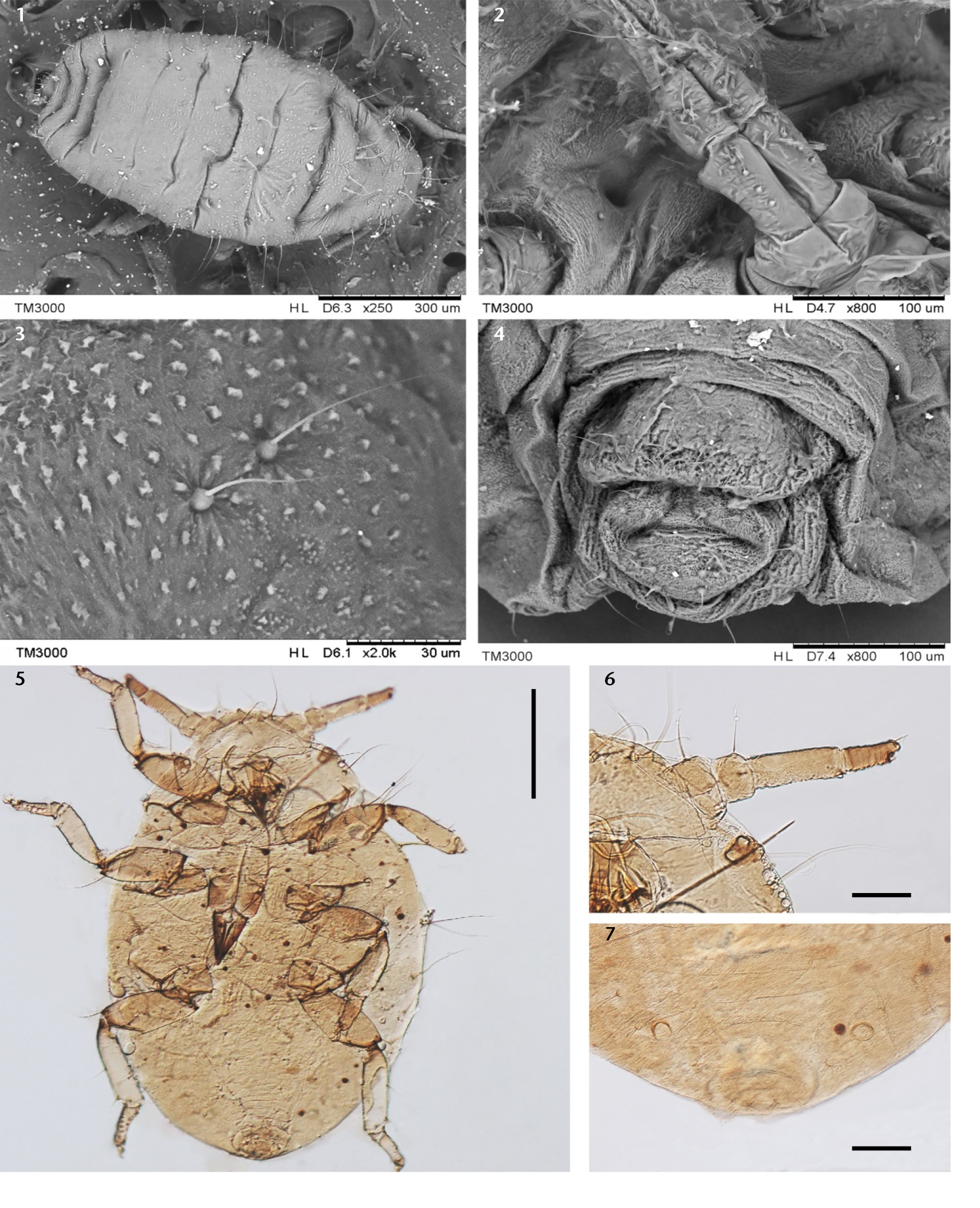

Scientific classification
- Kingdom: Animalia
- Phylum: Arthropoda
- Clade: Pancrustacea
- Class: Insecta
- Order: Hemiptera
- Suborder: Sternorrhyncha
- Family: Aphididae
- Genus: Nipponaphis
- Species: N. hubeiensis

Binomial name
- Nipponaphis hubeiensis Wang & Chen in Wang, Cui, Chen, Bashir & Chen, 2021

= Nipponaphis hubeiensis =

Species of aphid

Nipponaphis hubeiensis is a species of aphid discovered in 2021 in China, making N. hubeniensis the third species discovered in China. The species on average is 1.25 mm in length.

== Description ==
Nipponaphis hubeiensis have oval bodies, thorax and head. The head and pronotum are completely fused and the species have a dense epandrium on the dorsum of the body. The body is 1.25 mm in length and 0.62 mm in width. The head in 0.088 mm long making it 0.07 times length of the body. The thorax and abdomen are both 0.50 mm in length making up 0.4 times the length of the body. The antenna is short being around 4 segments making it 0.20 mm in length. The rostral length of segment IV and segment V are 0.98 mm. One pair of conical siphunculi are present on the apex abdomen. The hind femur is 0.12 mm long and the hind tibia are 0.16 mm in length. Hind tarsus II is 0.07 mm long and the tarsus terminal splits into two lateral claws without a paw pad. The galls are oval and has a closed single chamber gall around 0.30 to 0.50 mm in length and 25 to 35 mm in width. Galls are brown when matured but are pale cyan when fresh. The wall of the gall is 3 to 4 mm in length and has many spindle shaped pits on the inner surface of gall wall. There is wax inside of the gall and during maturity the galls form into holes forming a secondary opening.
